Sam, Burkina Faso may refer to:

Sam, Boulkiemdé
Sam, Bourzanga
Sam, Kongoussi